Bagnall-Oakeley is a double-barrelled name. Notable people with the name include:
Mary Ellen Bagnall-Oakeley (1833–1904), English antiquarian, author, and painter
Richard Bagnall-Oakeley (1865–1947), Welsh archer who competed at the 1908 Summer Olympics

See also
Bagnall (disambiguation)
Oakeley

Compound surnames
English-language surnames
Surnames of English origin